My Favorite Guitars is the twenty-sixth studio album by Chet Atkins. The guitars referred to are Atkins' signature Gretsch "Country Gentleman" electric guitar, a Brazilian Del Vecchio (guitar maker) resonator guitar presented to him by Los Indios Tabajaras, and a Spanish Juan Estruch classical guitar, all visible on the LP cover photo. It is another example of Atkins' 1960s easy-going, easy-listening guitar playing.

Reissues 
 My Favorite Guitars was reissued on CD along with It's a Guitar World in 1995 on One Way Records.

Track listing

Side one 
 "Levee Walking" (Jerry Reed Hubbard, Henry Strzelecki) – 1:56
 "Wimoweh" (Campbell) – 2:45
 "One Note Samba" (Hendricks, Antônio Carlos Jobim, Newton Mendonça) – 2:04
 "Moon of Manakoora" (Frank Loesser, Alfred Newman) – 2:09
 "Travelin'" (James Arnold Miller) – 2:18
 "Say It With Soul" (Fred Carter, Jr.) – 2:45

Side two 
 "Josephine" (Burke Bivens, Gus Kahn, Wayne King) – 2:06
 "Rose Ann" (Jerry Reed) – 2:20
 "Sukiyaki" (Hashida Naramura Rokusuke) – 2:28
 "It Don't Mean a Thing (If It Ain't Got That Swing)" (Duke Ellington, Irving Mills) – 2:18
 "El Vaquero" (Atkins, Wayne Moss) – 2:07
 "Chopin Waltz No. 10 in B Minor" (Frédéric Chopin; arranged by Chet Atkins) – 3:50

Personnel 
 Chet Atkins – guitar
Chuck Seitz - engineer

References 

1964 albums
Chet Atkins albums
Albums produced by Bob Ferguson (music)
RCA Victor albums